18th Street station is a commuter rail station on the Near South Side of Chicago, at 18th Street near Calumet Avenue. It serves the Metra Electric Line north to Millennium Station and south to University Park, Blue Island, and South Chicago. For many Metra Electric trains, this is a flag stop, and the train will only stop there if specifically requested by a passenger. As of 2018, 18th Street is the 226th busiest of Metra's 236 non-downtown stations, with an average of 23 weekday boardings.

The station is also occasionally served by trains of the South Shore Line to Gary and South Bend, Indiana, on an exceptional basis for Chicago Bears home games during football season. As part of a non-compete agreement with Metra, eastbound South Shore trains will not discharge passengers, and westbound trains will not receive passengers.

The station was originally built by the Illinois Central Railroad (ICRR). The railroad was first built in 1907.

References

External links 

Station from Google Maps Street View

Former Illinois Central Railroad stations
Metra stations in Chicago